Rupert Goodwins (born 23 May 1965) is a British writer, broadcaster and technology journalist.

He began his career as a programmer for Sinclair Research in the early 1980s, working on the ZX Spectrum ROM. He moved to Amstrad after it bought the rights to the Sinclair name and range of products.

He was the Technical Editor of IT Week magazine and has written for a number of other UK computer publications, including:

 Sinclair User
 Personal Computer World
 MacUser UK
 PC Magazine (UK)
 Nature
 The Daily Telegraph

Rupert also wrote the 64-page novella accompanying the game Weird Dreams by Rainbird.

He was editor of ZDNet UK. His most notable contribution to the site was Rupert's Diary, which preceded the blogging phenomenon by some years. He occasionally appeared on CNet UK's technology podcast, Crave, and the Dialogue Box video series.

In addition to journalism, he also writes short stories, often with a technological theme to them. He is a regular contributor to radio and television news and current affairs programmes on business and technology issues.

Rupert is also a keen amateur radio operator with the call sign G6HVY.

Bibliography

Online archived short stories
"The Cold Winds of Heaven," in Quanta (1991), edited by Daniel K. Appelquist

Essays and reporting

References 

1965 births
Living people
ZX Spectrum
British male journalists
European amateur radio operators
21st-century British inventors
Amateur radio people